Clapham is a village and civil parish in the Borough of Bedford in Bedfordshire, England. It had a population of 3,643 as at the 2001 census, increasing to 4,560 at the 2011 Census.

Points of interest

RAF Twinwood Farm, a disused airfield on the western outskirts of the village, is where the famous bandleader Glenn Miller took off on his last fateful flight, having performed for the American soldiers based at the airfield (51 Operational Training Unit ROYAL AIR FORCE was the main unit based at Twinwood Farm) and at Bedford Corn Exchange. The Glenn Miller Museum is now open on site with many events taking place during the summer months.

Clapham Park, a large new country house, was built by James Howard, member of parliament for Bedford, in 1872.

There is also a derelict Italian POW camp, which is now owned by a farmer and has been the victim of graffiti artists.

Sport and recreation
Clapham has a King George V Field in memorial to King George V. Recently, Towers Gymnasium and Health Club has been built on the road between Clapham and Bedford. It has a Swimming Pool, Sauna, Tennis court and gym equipment.

Twinwoods hosts an annual Folk Music Festival, called the Twinwoods Festival, typically over the August Bank Holiday weekend.

References

External links

 Clapham community website
 Places I've visited – Clapham by Ian Meadows
 Clapham Historical Society
 Twinwood's Music Festival

 
Villages in Bedfordshire
Civil parishes in Bedfordshire
Borough of Bedford